Dr. Cleopatra Doumbia-Henry is President of the World Maritime University. She is an international lawyer, a global leader on maritime law, labour standards and labour law, and law of international organizations. Dr. Doumbia-Henry is a distinguished academic in the field of international law and an international advocate for sustainability and innovation.Appointed by the Secretary-General of the International Maritime Organization (IMO), Dr. Doumbia-Henry became the seventh President, the first woman President and the first from a developing country of the World Maritime University (WMU), a university established within the framework of the IMO.

Professional career

President of the World Maritime University 
As the chief executive officer of WMU, she oversees and directs the operations and administration of the university, positioning it as the global centre of excellence in maritime and ocean education, research and capacity building, taking on board the UN SDGs.

Senior positions at the International Labour Organization (ILO) 
Prior to joining WMU, Dr. Doumbia-Henry held various senior positions at the International Labour Organization (ILO), another specialized agency of the United Nations. She joined the ILO in 1986 and served as Senior Legal Officer in the Office of the Legal Adviser; Director, Sectoral Activities Department before taking up the position as Director of the International Labour Standards Department. During her tenure as Director of the International Labour Standards Department (first woman Director since the establishment of the ILO in 1919), Dr. Doumbia-Henry was responsible for the ILO's international labour standards policy and for the ILO's supervisory bodies and procedures governing international labour standards. She led the department to effectively assist the ILO member States on the implementation of their international obligations (more than 400 Conventions and Recommendations) including through technical assistance, advice, research and capacity building programmes. She spearheaded the development of the innovative and historic ILO Maritime Labour Convention (MLC), 2006 which consolidated 68 international labour instruments. The MLC, 2006 as amended has been ratified to date by 91 member States  to date covering more than 80 per cent of the world tonnage of ships. Dr. Doumbia-Henry also led the ILO's participation in a number of IMO/ILO inter-agency collaborations on several issues of common interest, including the Joint IMO/ILO Ad Hoc Expert Working Groups on Fair Treatment of Seafarers and on Liability and Compensation regarding Claims for Death, Personal Injury and Abandonment of Seafarers.

Maritime Labour Convention (MLC), 2006 
Dr. Doumbia-Henry spearheaded work on and had a special responsibility for the innovative and historic ILO Maritime Labour Convention, 2006 which consolidates 68 ILO instruments. This convention has unparalleled success among ILO Conventions which is reflected in the high level of ratification of this convention, 92 member States of the ILO covering more than 80 per cent of the world tonnage of ships. Today, the MLC, 2006 is an important ILO flagship instrument and one that paves the way for the modernization and greater impact of the existing body of ILO standards. Dr Doumbia-Henry is familiarly referred to as the Mother of the MLC, 2006.

Early career 
Dr. Doumbia-Henry began her career at the University of the West Indies, Barbados, as lecturer in law and later worked at the Iran-US Claims Tribunal in The Hague, the Netherlands.

Academic career 
Dr. Doumbia-Henry's qualifications include Barrister-at-Law and Solicitor, a PhD and LLM from the University of Geneva and the Graduate Institute of International Studies, and an LL.M. and LLB from the University of West Indies. She has published extensively on a wide range of international law subjects.

References 

1953 births
Living people
Dominica expatriates in Switzerland
International Labour Organization people
International Maritime Organization people
University of Geneva alumni
Graduate Institute of International and Development Studies alumni
University of the West Indies academics
University of the West Indies alumni
Dominica women lawyers